Kud Zuru (also Romanized as Kūd Zūrū) is a village in Jolgah Rural District, in the Central District of Jahrom County, Fars Province, Iran. At the 2006 census, its population was 48, in 13 families.

References 

Populated places in Jahrom County